Nicholas Pope (1949, Sydney), British/Australian artist. He studied at the Bath Academy of Art (1970–73). In 1974 he was granted a Romanian Government Exchange Scholarship and in 1976 the Calouste Gulbenkian Foundation Award.

Pope's work from the 1970s has a powerful abstract quality that is softened by his use of natural materials, chalk and wood. His most important early shows included solo exhibitions at the Garage Gallery in London (1976), the Anthony Stokes Gallery (1979), and the Art & Project Gallery in Amsterdam (1979).  In 1980 Pope represented Britain at the XXXIX Venice Biennale, and in 1981 he traveled to Zimbabwe as a British Council Cultural Visitor.

In 1982 Pope contracted a rare form of encephalitic virus after a visit to Africa. It was undiagnosed for several years and his work was impaired due to a degree of permanent brain damage being inflicted.  In 1987 Pope withdrew from the art world and abandoned his studio work. This period of inactivity continued until 1992, after which religion and Christianity became a strong theme in his new work.

The first comprehensive monograph of Pope's work was published by Ridinghouse in 2013. This title features sculptures and drawings by Pope from the 1970s to present, along with texts by Tate Britain Director Penelope Curtis, Christopher Townsend and Andrew Sabin.

Pope now lives and works in Herefordshire. His work is included in many museum collection in Australia, the United Kingdom and the Netherlands. Pope is represented by The Sunday Painter, London.

References

External links
website, including exhibitions and biography, nicholaspope.co.uk

Oak Wood Column, Tate Gallery
Stacked Lead (1976), Tate Gallery
Big Hoos (1982), Tate Gallery
Liar Liar (2008–9), Tate Gallery

20th-century Australian sculptors
British sculptors
British male sculptors
Living people
21st-century Australian sculptors
Year of birth missing (living people)